John Wydareny (born February 15, 1941) is a former professional Canadian football player in the Canadian Football League. Wydareny played defensive back for the Toronto Argonauts and the Edmonton Eskimos from 1963 to 1972. Wydareny was an All-Star in the 1969 and 1970 CFL seasons, and was Edmonton's nominee for Most Outstanding Canadian player in 1969. He played college football at the University of Western Ontario.

References 

1941 births
Living people
Canadian football defensive backs
Edmonton Elks players
Players of Canadian football from Ontario
Toronto Argonauts players
Western Mustangs football players